Brody Paterson (born 24 April 2001) is a Scottish professional footballer, who plays for Scottish Championship club Cove Rangers, on loan from Hartlepool United, as a fullback or a winger.

Career
Born in Kirkcaldy, Paterson began his playing career with Dunfermline Athletic, before moving to Celtic's youth sector at the age of 12. In June 2018, he signed his first professional contract with Celtic, which was then renewed in May 2020, when he penned a new three-year deal.

Whilst under contract with Celtic, Paterson spent time on loan at Queen's Park, where he won the 2020–21 Scottish League Two, and then Airdrieonians, where he reached the promotional play-offs of the 2021–22 Scottish League One, as the club eventually lost to Queen's Park in the final round. At the end of the latter season, Paterson left Celtic after turning down an offer for a new contract extension.

On 4 July 2022, Paterson joined EFL League Two side Hartlepool United on a two-year deal. On 9 January 2023, Paterson signed for Cove Rangers on loan for the remainder of the season.

Style of play 
Paterson is a left-back, who can also play as a left winger, and provides cover both in defensive and offensive actions.

He has cited Kieran Tierney as his main source of inspiration.

Honours 

Queen's Park

 Scottish League Two: 2020–21

Airdrieonians

 Scottish League One runner-up: 2021–22

References

2001 births
Living people
Scottish footballers
Dunfermline Athletic F.C. players
Celtic F.C. players
Queen's Park F.C. players
Airdrieonians F.C. players
Hartlepool United F.C. players
Cove Rangers F.C. players
Scottish Professional Football League players
Association football fullbacks
Association football wingers
English Football League players